Loverama is the fifth studio album by the Australian band Custard. It was released in June 1999 and peaked at number 19 on the ARIA Charts; the band's highest charting album.

Loverama was the band's final release for 16 years, until 2015's Come Back, All Is Forgiven. Some copies came as a two-CD set, with the companion disc called Custaro Musico.

"Girls Like That (Don't Go For Guys Like Us)", "Ringo (I feel Like...)" and "Hit Song" all featured in a Hottest 100, with Girls... in 1998 and the other two in 1999.

Reception
Rolling Stone Australia at the time of release said, it was noted that the album was less "zany" and more dance-oriented than previous releases, though the "puerile song titles and cock-eyed world view remain." Overall, the album was described as, "top-heavy with infectious ditties."

They also named it the 94th best Australian album in 2021, saying, "Ever-beloved by the alt-rock scene for their quirky style, eccentric compositions, and endearing personalities, Loverama gave the wider public an insight into what had made Custard firm favourites for a decade by that point. Fittingly though, Loverama would end up serving as the group's swansong, with Custard announcing their initial split the following year."

Track listing

Charts

References

1999 albums
Custard (band) albums